EMC2 or variant may refer to:

EMC2
 EMC2, the corporate logo of the EMC Corporation

EMC2
 EMC2, Energy/Matter Conversion Corporation, Inc., a company founded by Robert W. Bussard to develop fusion power with a device called the Polywell
 EMC2, the first computer-based non-linear editing system, introduced in 1989 by Editing Machines Corp.
 LinuxCNC, formerly EMC2, the second variant of Enhanced Machine Controller, Linux-based CNC software
 EMC2, the gene that codes for the protein TTC35

Other uses
E = mc² is the equation for mass-energy equivalence.

See also
E=MC2 (disambiguation)
EMCC (disambiguation)
EMC (disambiguation)